Kuo Kuan-lin (Chinese: 郭冠麟 ; born 3 February 2004) is a Taiwanese badminton player. He was the boys' singles champion at the 2022 BWF World Junior Championships.

Personal life 
Kuo is from Kaohsiung City, Taiwan. He studied at the Kaohsiung Municipal Ying-Ming Junior High School.

Achievements

World Junior Championships 
Boys' singles

BWF International Challenge/Series (1 runner-up)
Men's singles

  BWF International Challenge tournament
  BWF International Series tournament
  BWF Future Series tournament

References

External links 

 
 

Living people
2004 births
Sportspeople from Kaohsiung
Taiwanese male badminton players
21st-century Taiwanese people